Carlos Perner (born 1 October 1947) is an Argentine alpine skier. He competed at the 1964 Winter Olympics and the 1972 Winter Olympics.

References

1947 births
Living people
Argentine male alpine skiers
Olympic alpine skiers of Argentina
Alpine skiers at the 1964 Winter Olympics
Alpine skiers at the 1972 Winter Olympics
Sportspeople from Bariloche